Charles Masson Fox (9 November 1866 – 11 October 1935) was a Cornish businessman who achieved international prominence in the world of chess problems and a place in the homosexual history of Edwardian England.

Masson Fox was born into a Quaker family (although he was not related to the Quakers' founder George Fox) and was second cousin once removed of the fraudulent sinologist Sir Edmund Backhouse, 2nd Baronet.  Living throughout his life in the Cornish seaside town of Falmouth, Fox in the early decades of his life was a senior partner of his family's timber firm, Fox Stanton & Company, and was also on the Board of Messrs G C Fox & Company, a long-established firm of shipping agents.

Fox is described by chess historian Thomas Rayner Dawson (1889–1951) as "a friendly man, kind, mellow, lovable, bringing peace and comfort and serene joy with him".  He was also a discreet but active homosexual.  In 1909 he visited Venice with his friend James Cockerton, meeting the writer Frederick Rolfe and becoming the reluctant recipient of Rolfe's famous Venice Letters, in which the gay subculture of Venice is vividly described.

In 1912–13 Fox was blackmailed by a woman who accused him of seducing her 16-year-old son.  Eventually Fox reported the matter to the police and the woman was sent to prison for five years and her son for one year, with hard labour. However, Fox was profoundly affected by the publicity surrounding the case, which was reported in detail in the local press.  The predictable result of his courageous action was the destruction of his reputation, and the compromise of his business and social life in Falmouth.

Although he continued to live in Cornwall, the focus of his social life shifted to London, and in the last two decades of his life, Fox became prominent in the world of chess. He was elected President of the Cornwall Chess Association, played a prominent part in the development of the British Chess Problem Society, and is still renowned as one of the greatest ever exponents of fairy chess (chess problems with variations in the rules).

Problem 

Solution of problem is: 1.Gh3 Gh4 2.Gh5 Gh6 3.Gh7 Gh8 4.Ge7 Gd7 5.Gc7 Gb7 6.Ga7+ Ga6 7.Ga5+ Ga4 8.Ga3#

References 

 Frederick Rolfe, Baron Corvo, The Venice Letters, Cecil Woolf, 1974 
 Robert Scoble, Raven: The Turbulent World of Baron Corvo, Strange Attractor Press, 2013, . Chapter 13, "The Quest for Cockerton", pages 308–325, recounts the details of Fox's and Cockerton's fateful meeting with Rolfe in Venice.
 T.R.Dawson, C.M. Fox, His Problems, 1936

External links 
 British Chess Problems
 Charles Masson Fox
 Raven: The Turbulent World of Baron Corvo
 Fox problems on PDB Server

Chess composers
1866 births
1935 deaths
People from Falmouth, Cornwall
Charles Masson
English chess players
Writers from Cornwall
English LGBT people
British chess writers